Vindobona (minor planet designation: 231 Vindobona) is a large Main belt asteroid. It was discovered by Austrian astronomer Johann Palisa on September 10, 1882. Vindobona is the Latin name for Vienna, Austria, the city where the discovery was made.

Its dark surface indicates a carbon-rich composition.

Photometric observations at the Organ Mesa Observatory in New Mexico during 2012 showed a rotation period of 14.245 ± 0.001 hours with a brightness
variation of 0.20 ± 0.03 in magnitude. This is in agreement with previous results.

References

External links
 The Asteroid Orbital Elements Database
 Minor Planet Discovery Circumstances
 Asteroid Lightcurve Data File
 
 

Background asteroids
Vindobona
18820910
Vindobona